Kigo is a neighborhood in the town of Ssabagabo in Uganda. The name also refers to Kigo Hill, that forms part of the neighborhood.

Location
Kigo is located in the south-eastern corner of Ssabagabo Municipality in Busiro County, Wakiso District, in Uganda's Buganda Region. It is bordered by Lweeza and Mutungo to the west, Ndejje-Lubugumu to the north-west, Kanaba Trading Centre to the north, Kubbiri and Munyonyo to the north-east, Kaazi and Busaabala to  the east and Lake Victoria to the south. The coordinates of Kigo are 
0°12'25.0"N, 32°35'38.0"E (Latitude:0.206944; Longitude:32.593889).

Overview
Kigo is located in fast-growing Ssabagabo Municipality, which is predominantly affluent and residential.

The Lake Victoria Serena Resort, one of the two Serena Hotels properties in the country, with its expansive 9-hole golf course is located in this neighborhood.

Mirembe Villas a residential development of upmarket apartments and condominiums lies immediately east to the Serena Resort Golf Course.

The Kajjansi–Munyonyo extension of the Entebbe–Kampala Expressway, passes through the neighbourhood in a general west to east direction, before it turns northeasterly to end at Munyonyo, thus forming patrt of the Kampala Southern Bypass Highway.

Kigo Medium Security Prison is located on a peninsular, in the south-eastern part of the neighborhood. Plans to relocate the prison to make way for commercial development have not been implemented as of January 2019.

See also
 Luzira Maximum Security Prison
 Kitalya Maximum Security Prison

References

External links
Buganda Kingdom invests in mega US$65m housing project As of 12 April 2015.

Populated places in Central Region, Uganda
Wakiso District
Ssabagabo